Wu Changde (born 1952) is a retired general of the Chinese People's Liberation Army (PLA). He served as deputy director of the Political Work Department of the Central Military Commission from 2011 to 2017.

Biography
Wu Changde was born in 1952 in Dayu County, Jiangxi. He joined the People's Liberation Army (PLA) in December 1970 and the Chinese Communist Party in 1972. He graduated from the Department of Philosophy of Fudan University in Shanghai.

Wu was appointed deputy director of the political department of the Nanjing Military Region from July 2003, and director of the political department of the Chengdu Military Region from June 2007. In July 2011, he became a deputy director of Political Work Department  .

Wu Changde attained the rank of major general in 1997 and lieutenant general in 2008.
On 31 July 2013, he was promoted to general (shangjiang), the highest rank for Chinese military officers in active service.

Wu was a member of the 18th Central Committee of the Chinese Communist Party (2012–2017).

References

1952 births
Living people
People's Liberation Army generals from Jiangxi
People from Ganzhou
Fudan University alumni
Directors of the Political Department of the Chengdu Military Region
Deputy chiefs of the People's Liberation Army General Political Department
Members of the 18th Central Committee of the Chinese Communist Party
Members of the 13th Chinese People's Political Consultative Conference